The Return is the tenth studio album of South Korean boy band Shinhwa, in commemoration of their 14th anniversary. It was released on 23 March 2012 by Shinhwa Company and distributed by CJ E&M Music. The album and its associated concerts, 2012 Shinhwa Grand Tour: The Return, marks their comeback to the music industry after a four-year hiatus, since their 10th anniversary concert and album Volume 9 in 2008, during which band members served individual mandatory military services.

It was first released as a limited edition and followed by a Thanks Edition on 11 April. According to Gaon Chart, as of the end of August 2013, the album has sold a cumulative total of 88,059 copies.

Album and music video
The album features electropop lead track "Venus", produced by Gandalf and written by Andrew Jackson, Gandalf Roudette-Muschamp and Joshua Thompson. The lyrics was written by Shinhwa member Lee Min-woo, credited as 'M', about a man’s revelation towards a woman. On 19 March 2012, the teaser for the music video was released, showing individual member black-and-white footage searching for their 'Venus'. It was directed by Kim Kwang-suk, the CF director behind Samsung Ultra Laptop and Nikon Camera adverts, with a modern vampire theme and high intensity choreography. The full MV was released on 28 March 2012 on Shinhwa official YouTube channel. On 10 April a dance version of it was also released. On 19 July 2012 two further music videos were released, "Be My Love" and "Breathin'", which features behind-the-scene comeback footage, concert and overseas clips.

Other contributions by Shinhwa members included lyrics for "Hurts" and "Move With Me" by Eric; lyrics and composition for "Red Carpet" and "Stay" by Lee Min-woo, who also wrote the lyrics "Be My Love". As well as lyrics for "Let It Go" by Shin Hye-sung.

"On the Road" is a Britpop track with heavy acoustic rhythm. It talks about the sacrifices members made while awaiting their return, the gratefulness they have for their fans, as well as reflections on the long journey they have traveled on and new ones together in the future. "Hurts", an eight-beat pop track, is the album's lead ballad track, with vocals directed by Eric. It was a remake of Frankie J's song with a new rap style by Eric. "Red Carpet" with a thick beat and synth vocals, is another electropop dance track. co-produced by Lee Min-woo and producer Kim Do-hyun. "Move with Me", a hip hop style track that showcases Eric’s rap-writing skills and individual members' rhythmical vocals. "Let It Go" is a special song gifted by Aziatix member Eddie Shin and Jung Jae-yoon of 1990’s group, Solid. It features a simple R&B style beat and an oriental riff, with a prominent rock-feel electric guitar chorus. The lyrics is about a man knowing that he has to move on but still misses the woman who left him. "Stay" aims to highlight the different colours of each members, has a cheerful rhythm and exciting melody. "Welcome", a solid and powerful track, with a fresh and vigorous sound. "Be My Love", with slick grooves, a sweet melody, disco bass guitar and strings, encompasses the soul, funk and disco feel of the 1960s and 1970s. "Re-Love", an urban R&B ballad, has a powerful synthesizer sound and hip hop beat to a slow tempo, with heavy vocal harmonization. It talks about forgetting the pain and hardships of life thus far and to start anew together, from the perspective of an individual to his lover. "Breathin’", an electropop track, that features a modern and mysterious groove with a dream-like feel.

Promotion and reception
On 14 March 2012, stills from the MV for "Venus" were released, showing members in individual and group dance shots dressed in all black outfits. On 20 March, individual teaser photos of Eric and Kim Dong-wan were released, showing a modern vampire theme. This was followed by photos of Jun Jin and Lee Min-woo on 21 March, and the final photos of Andy and Shin Hye-sung the following day, as well as two behind-the-scene MV making-of videos. 
 
On the day of release "Venus" took first place on various online music charts, including Mnet, Bugs Music, Olleh Music, MelOn, Soribada, Naver Music and Daum Music. The album debut at number three on Gaon Album Chart for the week of 18 to 24 March 2012, and was number 5 on Gaon Monthly Album Chart for March with 32,500 copies sold. As of the end of 2012, the album has sold a cumulative total of 83,058 copies.

On 25 March, during the encore performance of 2012 Shinhwa Grand Tour in Seoul: The Return, Shin Hye-sung dislocated his right knee, and was rushed to the emergency room before the end of the concert. At the start of the performance of "Yo!", he was shot up on stage but did not land properly, rupturing the cruciate ligament and severely damaged the cartilage and ligament surrounding the meniscus, requiring surgery and six months of rest. Shin had previously ruptured his cruciate ligament sustained during a concert in 2001, and had corrective surgery on his left knee but the cruciate ligament in his right knee continued to suffer damage. However he has put off surgery, but with continue treatment, till the end of promotional activities for the album. Hence they performed "Hurt" singing in chairs and with a substitute dancer for "Venus", for their comeback on 29 March on M! Countdown. This also mark their first televised comeback performance in four years.

After four weeks of promotion, "Venus" won first place on M.net's live music show M! Countdown on 19 April, the first for the group since their comeback.

Track listing

Music video
 "Venus" - 28 March 2012
 "Venus" (dance version) - 10 April 2012
 "Be My Love" - 19 July 2012 - features behind-the-scene comeback footage
 "Breathin'" - 19 July 2012 - features behind-the-scene concert footage

Release history
The album was first released as a limited edition of 30,000 copies in a hard case with an A4 size 80-page photobook. Shinhwa Company announced on 2 April that a Thanks Edition will be released with pre-order available from the same day. The new edition is designed by graphic artist Ikama; who has previously worked with Shinhwa, Shin Hye-sung and Lee Min-woo on their solo projects. It is re-packaged in a white box with a new and different logo design of the group on the cover, plus a 70-page photobook. However the release was delayed from 6 April to 11 April in order to meet demand.

The album was released in Taiwan on 27 April 2012 by Universal Music Taiwan with a bonus DVD containing the music video of lead track "Venus".

Charts

Album chart

References

2012 albums
Shinhwa albums
Universal Music Taiwan albums